C-Boy (d. June 2018, age ~14) was a lion in the Serengeti National Park, Tanzania. He is known for having survived an attack from a pack of three male lions, nicknamed "The Killers", in August 2009. He later nearly succumbed to infection after the attack. A decade later, C-Boy was found dead due to unknown causes. Photographer Nick Nichols took pictures of him during visits to the Serengeti between 2011 and 2013.

References

2018 animal deaths
Individual lions
Individual wild animals